Ivett Szepesi (born 4 February 1986 in Pincehely) is a Hungarian handballer who plays for Hódmezővásárhelyi LKC in left wing position.

Achievements
EHF Champions League:
Winner: 2013, 2014
Nemzeti Bajnokság I:
Winner: 2013, 2014
Magyar Kupa:
Winner: 2013, 2014, 2015

References

External links
 Ivett Szepesi Profile on Győri ETO KC's Official Website

1986 births
Living people
Sportspeople from Tolna County
Hungarian female handball players
Győri Audi ETO KC players